The National Federation of Demolition Contractors Ltd is a trade association representing businesses involved in demolition work.

It arose from an informal group of demolition contractors assembled to deal with damaged building during The Blitz then in 1946, incorporated as The National Federation of Demolition Contractors Ltd.

The federation is based in the United Kingdom but describes itself as the Voice of the Global Demolition Industry.

References

External links
 NFDC group web page

Construction trade groups based in the United Kingdom
Building
Engineering organizations